Star Air A/S is a Danish cargo airline and part of Danish business conglomerate Maersk. It operates a fleet of 14 Boeing 767 cargo aircraft. Several of these are on contract to United Parcel Service (UPS) and operate out of Cologne Bonn Airport, Germany & East Midlands Airport, UK.Star Air is headquartered in Dragør, Denmark, at the premises of Copenhagen Airport.

The airline was established in 1987 with the purchase of Alkair's Fokker 27 operation. Originally the airline had three Fokker F27 Friendships, which later increased to four. These were used for both passenger and cargo operations. One was involved in a fatal accident in 1988. Star Air secured a last-minute deal with UPS in 1993, allowing it to start operations out of Cologne/Bonn with Boeing 727s. Star Air became a subsidiary of now defunct Maersk Air in 1993. The Fokkers were retired in 1996—after which the airline had exclusively flown for UPS. Boeing 757s were introduced in 2001. From 2005 to 2006 the airline replaced its entire fleet, introducing the current 767s. Meanwhile, Maersk Air was sold to Sterling Airlines and ownership resumed to the Maersk Group. In 2013 the airline had a revenue of DKK 813 million and a net profit of DKK 69 million. It employed 119 pilots, 41 mechanics and 36 administrative staff.

History

Early years

The Maersk Group entered the airline industry when it established Maersk Air in 1979. Given the nature of the mother company, Maersk Air looked at the possibilities to operate the cargo segment. The airline started operation with three F27s, mounted with cargo doors for easy conversion to cargo configuration. Oriental Air Transport Services, a cargo handling company based at Kastrup, was bought in 1971. The airline aimed at buying a Boeing 747, but restrictions on freight caused these plans to be abandoned.

Until 1987 the rules in Denmark only permitted SAS to operate freight charters. The only exception was if the entire shipment had a single sender and recipient. This made filling an entire cargo plane uneconomical and resulted in Maersk abandoning its cargo plans. Maersk Air Cargo was founded in 1982, but only acted as a cargo division. Due to the regulations, it only acted as a ground handling agent for overseas airlines, the largest being Cathay Pacific.

When the deregulation took effect in 1987, the Maersk Group immediately established Star Air as a subsidiary directly under the corporation. Incorporated on 1 September 1987, it bought an existing hangar on the south sector of Copenhagen Airport. The ground facilities, an organization and an air operator's certificate was taken over through the purchase of Alkair.

Three Fokker F-27-600s were leased and converted to combi-freighters. These could be converted from freighter to passenger configuration in half an hour. Star Air originally had a mix of operations. One part was corporate charters, one was wet leasing to other airlines, one was charter and domestic operations for Maersk Air, and finally it conducted European hauls for freight companies, including FedEx, TNT and UPS.

By 1990 the airline was operating four F-27s and had a revenue of DKK 66 million. But with increased competition, the airline made a loss of DKK 10 million in 1991. To cut costs the operations were transferred to a new legal entity, Star Air I/S, which was then placed under Maersk Air. Lack of sufficient cargo volumes resulted in Star Air carrying out passenger flights as well, on wet lease basis.

In 1991 UPS announced a tender to find a European partner. They did not themselves hold the rights to fly intra-European flights and needed a European airline to fly services out of the hub at Cologne Bonn Airport. The two main contenders were Star Air and Sterling Airways, another Danish airline. Sterling had two main advantages: they already operated the Boeing 727 and they were approved by the Federal Aviation Administration. The latter would allow them to operate aircraft which were owned by UPS and registered in the United States.

Sterling fell into financial distress in 1993 and months before the contract was to take effect its credits were cut off. UPS backed out of the deal and instead approached Star Air. An agreement was signed on 22 October 1993, with services commencing ten days later. This could be done because Star Air turned to Sterling employees who had been working on the preparations. People who had been employed by Sterling were instead hired by Star Air, giving them access to pilots, engineers and administrators. The initial contract involved flights to Milan, Rome, Zaragoza and Porto. The operations were gradually expanded and soon the airline was operating four 727s.

The same year Star Air started the process of retiring the Fokkers. Falling prices for smaller cargo aircraft made this part of the operation unprofitable. At the same time a closer integration with Maersk Air was carried out, in which the two companies received a common administration, operations center and navigational division. The Fokker F27s were retired in 1996 and since Star Air has solely flown for UPS. Star Air had a revenue of DKK 82 million in 1997, which rose to DKK 159 million in 2002. Its profits in this period varied between DKK 12 and 20 million.

A total of eight 727s entered service with Star Air; seven were of the larger -200 series and one, introduced in 1996, of the smaller -100 series. Two aircraft were taken into service in 1993, one more in 1994, two more in 1996, one more in 1997 and the last in 2001.

Development since the 2000s
Four Boeing 757-200s were introduced in 2001 and 2002, and the number of 727s cut to four.

After signing a new contract with a duration until 2015, Star Air carried out a full fleet replacement in 2005 and 2006. All the 727s and 757s were returned and instead eleven Boeing 767-200s were leased. This gave a major hike in revenue, increasing from DKK 106 million in 2004 to DKK 653 million in 2007. Profits increased from DKK 7 to 58 million. Maersk Air was sold to Sterling Airlines in 2005. Star Air was kept out of the deal and instead it made a subsidiary directly under the Maersk Group. It was also given the responsibility for operating the Maersk Group's corporate jet, a Canadair Challenger 600. Star Air took delivery of a Boeing 767-300 in 2014.

Operations
Star Air operates scheduled cargo flights on behalf of UPS Airlines out of its base at Cologne Bonn Airport as well as further freight operations on behalf of its parent Maersk and other customers on a charter basis.

Star Air also operates scheduled cargo flights on behalf of Royal Mail & UPS from East Midlands Airport to destinations across the United Kingdom & Europe such as Edinburgh Airport & Belfast Aldergrove.

Fleet

Current fleet

As of November 2021, the Star Air fleet consists of the following aircraft:

Former fleet

Accidents and incidents
 Star Air's only hull-loss accident took place on 26 May 1988. The Fokker F-27 OY-APE flew from Copenhagen to Billund, where to loaded cargo and continued onwards to Hannover Airport and Nuremberg Airport. The cargo was improperly distributed so that the aircraft became aft-heavy. Although the captain was aware of this situation, he did not relay the information to the first officer, who was the pilot flying. He therefore failed to correlate for this during the landing at Hannover, having the flaps set incorrectly. When the first officer power up for a go-around, the load shifted, the aircraft pitched up and the aircraft crashed. Both pilots were killed.

References

Bibliography

External links

Official website

Airlines of Denmark
Cargo airlines
Airlines established in 1987
1987 establishments in Denmark
Dragor
Maersk
Maersk Air
United Parcel Service